The Honda CBR models are a series of Honda sport bikes first introduced in 1983. With the exception of the single-cylinder CBR125R, CBR150R, CBR250R, and CBR300R, all CBR motorcycles have inline engines. Less sporting/general models make up CB series.

Types 

The CBR series includes:

Single-cylinder 
 CBR125R (2004–2016)
 CBR150R (2002–present)
 CBR250R (2011–2013, international; 2011–2021, Japan/Malaysia; 2011–2020, India)
 CBR300R (2015–present)

Inline-twin 
 CBR250RR (2017–present, Indonesia/Japan/Hong Kong/Macau/Thailand/Malaysia only)
 CBR400R (2013–present, Japan/Singapore only)
 CBR450SR (1989–1994, Brazil only)
 CBR500R (2013–present)

Inline-four 
 CBR250/250R/250RR (1986–2001)
 CBR400F/400R/400RR (1983–1994)
 CBR500F (1986–1993)
 CBR600F Hurricane/600F2/600F3/600F4/600F4i (1987–2006)
 CBR600F (2011–2013)
 CBR600RR (2003–present)
 CBR650F (2014–2018)
 CBR650R (2019–present)
 CBR750 Super Aero (1987–1988)
 CBR900RR Fireblade (893 cc: 1992–1995; 919 cc: 1996–1999)
 CBR929RR Fireblade (2000–2001)
 CBR954RR Fireblade (2002–2003)
 CBR1000RR Fireblade (2004–2019)
 CBR1000RR-R Fireblade (2020–present)
 CBR1000F Hurricane (1987–1999)
 CBR1100XX Super Blackbird (1996–2007)

CBR series
Sport bikes